Ricardo Viana Filho (born 23 April 2001), known as Ricardinho, is a Brazilian professional footballer who plays as a striker for Bulgarian First League club Levski Sofia.

Club career

Grêmio
Born in Guarulhos, Ricardinho joined the Grêmio's Academy at the age of 19 in 2020.

Marítimo
On 1 September 2021, he joined Portuguese club Marítimo on loan. On his Primeira Liga debut for Marítimo on 13 September 2021, he scored a goal in a 2–2 draw against Arouca.

Levski Sofia
On 20 December 2022, Ricardinho signed a 3-year deal with Bulgarian First League club Levski Sofia.

Personal life
Ricardinho is the son of Ricardo Viana, corporal of the military police of São Paulo. He has 2 sisters. In 2021 he lost his father and his grandfather to the COVID-19.

Career statistics

Club

Honours
Grêmio
Campeonato Gaúcho: 2021
Recopa Gaúcha: 2021, 2022

References

External links

Profile at the Grêmio F.B.P.A. website

2001 births
Footballers from São Paulo
Living people
Brazilian footballers
Association football forwards
Campeonato Brasileiro Série A players
Campeonato Brasileiro Série B players
Primeira Liga players
First Professional Football League (Bulgaria) players
Grêmio Foot-Ball Porto Alegrense players
Atlético Clube Goianiense players
C.S. Marítimo players
PFC Levski Sofia players
Brazilian expatriate footballers
Expatriate footballers in Portugal
Brazilian expatriate sportspeople in Portugal
Expatriate footballers in Bulgaria
Brazilian expatriate sportspeople in Bulgaria